Charles Louis de Bernard de Marigny  (— César during the Battle of the Saintes, on 12 April 1782) was a French Navy officer. He served in the War of American Independence.

Biography 
Bernard de Marigny joined the Navy as a Garde-Marine on 22 June 1756. His younger brother, Charles de Bernard de Marigny, also served in the Navy and rose to vice admiral.

He was promoted to Lieutenant on 27 November 1765, and to Lieutenant-colonel in 1777.

In 1778, he was in command of the 32-gun frigate Fortunée. He rose to Captain on 13 March 1779. 

After Fortunée was captured, Marigny was given command of the 64-gun Vaillant, which he captained at the Battle of Fort Royal on 29 April 1781, and later of Réfléchi.

On 17 July 1781, he took command of the 64-gun Actionnaire.

He captained the 74-gun César during the Battle of the Saintes, on 12 April 1782. He was wounded during the battle, and died when César exploded in the night following the battle.

Sources and references 
 Notes

Citations

References
 
 
 
 

External links
 

French Navy officers
French military personnel of the American Revolutionary War